Xinghua Subdistrict is a subdistrict of Ganjingzi District, Dalian, People's Republic of China, located to the east of Dalian Zhoushuizi International Airport. , it has 13 residential communities under its administration.

In 2019, Xinghua Subdistrict was abolished, its former administrative area merged into Zhonghua Road Subdistrict.

See also
List of township-level divisions of Liaoning

References

Township-level divisions of Liaoning